Alfred Joshua Butler F.S.A. (1850 - 1936) was a British ancient historian, specialized in the history of the Copts.

Biography 
He studied at University of Oxford and from 1877 worked at his Brasenose College. Author of works on Coptology and the history of Egypt during the period of Arab, Roman and Byzantine rule.

Alfred J. Butler was a self-confessed “friend of the Copts”. On them he wrote in 1911, having known the Copts for upwards of thirty years, I have the highest opinion of their capacity and their character. When the Coptic Congress in 1911 raised some demands to the British authority to end the injustices the Copts suffered from under British rule he sided with the Copts against Sir Eldon Gorst, the British Consul-General in Egypt (1907-1911), whose policy was (to) exalt the Mohammedan and to tread down the Christian, to license the majority and to curb the minority.

Works

References

1850 births
1936 deaths
Alumni of the University of Oxford
Coptologists
British classical scholars
Classical scholars of the University of Oxford
Fellows of the Society of Antiquaries of London